Events from the year 1947 in Ireland.

Incumbents
 President: Seán T. O'Kelly
 Taoiseach: Éamon de Valera (FF)
 Tánaiste: Seán Lemass (FF)
 Minister for Finance: Frank Aiken (FF)
 Chief Justice: Conor Maguire
 Dáil: 12th
 Seanad: 5th

Events
 19 January to 15 March – an arctic cold snap with five major blizzards caused many deaths.
 30 January – the internationally known labour leader Jim Larkin died in Dublin aged 72.
 18 May – the 21st anniversary of the founding of the Fianna Fáil party was celebrated in the Capitol Theatre, Dublin.
 7 July – the Aer Lingus airline began a direct service between Dublin and Amsterdam.
 31 July – the Soviet Union blocked Ireland's entry into the United Nations.
 11 August – the Enterprise Express train service commenced from Belfast to Dublin.
  31 August – United States Congressman John F. Kennedy visited his sister Kathleen in Ireland during the Congressional summer recess. He visited again in 1955 and 1963.
 14 September – the All-Ireland Football Final was played in the Polo Grounds in New York. Cavan were victorious over Kerry.
 3 November – a 60-day transport strike ended in Dublin. Trams and buses returned to normal service.
Undated
 The Customs Free Airport Act established Shannon as the world's first duty-free airport.
 The Poulaphouca Reservoir was completed.
 The Waterford Crystal glassmaking business was revived by Charles Bacik.

Arts and literature
 June – Joan Denise Moriarty's Cork Ballet Group gave its first performance, at the Cork Opera House under the baton of Aloys Fleischmann.
 Donagh MacDonagh's poetry The Hungry Grass was published.
 Séamus Ó Néill's novel Tonn Tuile was the first book published by Irish language publisher Sáirséal agus Dill in Dublin.

Sport

Football

League of Ireland
Winners: Shelbourne

FAI Cup
Winners: Cork United 2–2, 2–1 Bohemians.

Gaelic Games
 Cavan won historic All Ireland final in Polo Grounds, New York.

Golf
 The Irish Open was won by Harry Bradshaw (Ireland).

Swimming
 27–28 July – English endurance swimmer Tom Blower became the first person to swim the North Channel, from Donaghadee in County Down to Portpatrick in Scotland.

Births

 18 January – John O'Conor, pianist.
 26 January – Red Morris, 4th Baron Killanin, film producer.
 9 February – Eamon Duffy, religious historian.
 1 March
 Brian Fitzgerald, Labour Party TD.
 Liz McManus, Labour Party TD for Wicklow.
 Kate Walsh, Progressive Democrats Senator (died 2007).
 30 March
 Kevin Myers, journalist.
 Dick Roche, university lecturer, Fianna Fáil TD for Wicklow, Cabinet Minister.
 16 April – Eamonn Rogers, soccer player.
 17 April – Linda Martin, singer.
 24 April – Johnny McEvoy, singer.
 27 April – Patrick Lynch, Auxiliary Bishop of the Archdiocese of Southwark.
 18 May – John Bruton, Taoiseach, European Union Ambassador to the United States.
 22 May – Seán Ó Neachtain, Fianna Fáil Member of the European Parliament representing North-West.
 8 July – Jonathan Kelly, folk rock singer-songwriter.
 18 July – Dermot Healy, novelist and poet (died 2014).
 20 July – Joe O'Toole, President of the Irish Trades Union Congress and Senator.
 31 July – Olivia Mitchell, Fine Gael TD representing Dublin South (1997 – ).
 1 August – Tommy Broughan, Labour Party TD for Dublin North-East.
 3 August
 Sally Oldfield, singer.
 G. V. Wright, Fianna Fáil TD and member of Seanad Éireann.
 10 August – Dónal Lunny, musician.
 21 August – Philip Lawrence, a London-based headmaster, stabbed to death outside the gates of his school when he went to help a pupil being attacked by a gang (died 1995).
 25 August – Anne Harris, journalist.
 2 September – Kevin Farrell, Bishop of Dallas, Texas.
 7 September – Roger Bolton, trade unionist in UK (died 2006).
 2 October – Damien Martin, Offaly hurler.
 9 October – Frank Dunlop, public relations consultant, planning advisor, Fianna Fáil Government Press Secretary (1977–1982).
 26 October – Trevor Joyce, poet.
 9 November
 Pat Carey, Fianna Fáil TD for Dublin North-West and Minister of State.
 Frank Cummins, Kilkenny hurler.
 25 November
 Seán Ardagh, Fianna Fáil TD for Dublin South-Central (died 2016).
 Steve Heighway, soccer player.
 1 December – Jimmy Dunne, soccer player.
 4 December
 Moosajee Bhamjee, physician, Ireland's first Muslim Teachta Dála (1992–1997), 27th Dáil.
 Terry Woods, folk musician.
 5 December
 Tony Gregory, independent politician and TD for Dublin Central.
 Seán Quinn, businessman.
Full date unknown
 Vincent Brown, sculptor.
 Noel Elliott, international rugby union player.
 Éamonn Grimes, Limerick hurler.
 Pat Hegarty, Cork hurler.
 John Holloway, sociologist and philosopher.
 Dermot Somers, mountaineer, explorer, writer and broadcaster.

Deaths

 2 January – Tom Ross, cricketer (born in 1872).
 4 January – Derrick Hall, cricketer (born in 1892).
 4 January – Forrest Reid, novelist and literary critic (born in 1875).
 21 January – Charles A. Callis, member of the Quorum of the Twelve Apostles of the Church of Jesus Christ of Latter-day Saints (born in 1865).
 30 January – James Larkin, trade union leader, socialist and Labour Party TD (born in 1876).
 3 March – Michael Egan, trade unionist, city councillor, and Cumann na nGaedheal TD (born in 1866).
 9 April – Desmond FitzGerald, Sinn Féin MP, TD,  Cabinet Minister and Seanad Éireann member (born in 1888).
 16 May – Augusta Crichton-Stuart, Marchioness of Bute (born in 1880).
 18 June – John Henry Patterson, soldier, hunter and writer (born in 1867).
 4 September – P. J. Moloney, chemist, member of 1st Dáil representing Tipperary South.

References

 
1940s in Ireland
Ireland
Years of the 20th century in Ireland